Southport Hospital may refer to:

In Southport, Merseyside, England
Southport and Formby District General Hospital
Southport General Infirmary
Southport Promenade Hospital

In Southport, Queensland, Australia
Gold Coast Hospital
Gold Coast Private Hospital
Gold Coast University Hospital

In Southport, North Carolina, United States
Dosher Memorial Hospital